The 2022 AFC Futsal Asian Cup is the 16th edition of the AFC Futsal Asian Cup (previously known as the AFC Futsal Championship), the biennial international futsal championship organised by the Asian Football Confederation (AFC) for the men's national teams of Asia. A total of 16 teams compete in the tournament.

Kuwait was appointed as hosts of the 2020 AFC Futsal Championship, after replacing the original hosts Turkmenistan. However, AFC announced the cancellation of the tournament on 25 January 2021 due to the COVID-19 pandemic. The tournament was scheduled to be played in Kuwait from 16 to 27 February 2022. On 5 July 2021, the AFC announced that the tournament would be held between 27 September and 8 October 2022.

Japan defeated defending champions Iran in the final to claim their fourth title.

Qualification

Qualifiers were originally scheduled to be played from 13 to 24 October 2021. However, on 5 July 2021, the AFC announced that it would be held from 1 to 15 April 2022.

Qualified teams
The following 16 teams qualified for the final tournament.

1 Italic indicates hosts for that year.

Venues

Draw

Squads

Each team had to submit a squad of 14 players, including a minimum of two goalkeepers.

Group stage
The top two teams of each group advance to the quarter-finals.

Tiebreakers
Teams are ranked according to points (3 points for a win, 1 point for a draw, 0 points for a loss), and if tied on points, the following tiebreaking criteria are applied, in the order given, to determine the rankings (Regulations Article 11.5):
 Points in head-to-head matches among tied teams;
 Goal difference in head-to-head matches among tied teams;
 Goals scored in head-to-head matches among tied teams;
 If more than two teams are tied, and after applying all head-to-head criteria above, a subset of teams are still tied, all head-to-head criteria above are reapplied exclusively to this subset of teams;
 Goal difference in all group matches;
 Goals scored in all group matches;
 Penalty shoot-out if only two teams are tied and they met in the last round of the group;
 Disciplinary points (yellow card = 1 point, red card as a result of two yellow cards = 3 points, direct red card = 3 points, yellow card followed by direct red card = 4 points);
 Drawing of lots.

All times are local, AST (UTC+3).

Group A

Group B

Group C

Group D

Knockout stage
In the knockout stage, extra time and penalty shoot-out are used to decide the winner if necessary, except for the third place match where penalty shoot-out (no extra time) is used to decide the winner if necessary (Regulations Article 15.1).

Bracket

Quarter-finals

Semi-finals

Third place match

Final

Awards 
The following awards were given at the conclusion of the tournament:

Goalscorers

Final rankings

References

External links
, the-AFC.com

 
2022
Championship
2022 AFC Futsal Asian Cup
September 2022 sports events in Asia
October 2022 sports events in Asia
2022 in Kuwaiti sport